Pasupathihal is a village in Dharwad district in the southwestern state of Karnataka, India.

Demographics 
As of the 2011 Census of India there were 664 households in Pasupathihal and a total population of 3,416 consisting of 1,769 males and 1,647 females. There were 398 children ages 0-6.

References

Villages in Dharwad district